Scott Klement, born January 28, 1969, in Milwaukee, Wisconsin is an American computer scientist, author, and speaker recognized as a top evangelist for IBM i on IBM Power Systems computers. For twenty-eight years, Scott served as the IT Director of family owned Klement's Sausage, which was sold to Altamont Capital Partners in 2014.  In 2012 he left to work for Profound Logic Corporation. Scott is a member of the Strategic Education Team (SET) and a Subject Matter Expert (SME) at COMMON, the largest association of users of IBM compatible technology in the world. He has developed numerous frameworks and other open-source development tools, often works that make other technology accessible to the IBM i technology directly from RPG.  Many developments by others, including Thomas Raddatz as well as IBM itself, make use of Klement's software in products of their own. His work in developing tools which open the i is widely quoted by others, including sockets and other tools in the book Hacking iSeries, and UNIXCMD, which allows PHP to access UNIX commands from a script. In addition, Klement was a frequent contributor to various Penton Media trade magazines.

Personal
Scott resides in Milwaukee, Wisconsin, with his wife and son. He is an avid player of the sheepshead card game.

Awards
In 2005, Klement was awarded the Intellectual Solutions Award by IBM and COMMON for his website, which provided multiple tutorials and open source software to the IBM i community. He also received the Gary Guthrie Award for Excellence in Technical Writing and the silver medal for Best Feature Series by the American Society of Business Publication Editors (ASBPE).  Klement's skill is recognized as one of the best in the industry.  In 2012 Klement, along with Jim Buck and Aaron Bartell, was named a "Champion of Power" by IBM for their contributions to the Power Systems community.  He has been called "The most interesting man in the RPG world".

Partial list of frameworks and open-source projects

References

External links
Tools and Presentations Website

1969 births
Living people
Scientists from Milwaukee
American computer scientists